Antun Ivanković (born 25 March 1939) is a Croatian rower. He competed in the men's coxless pair event at the 1960 Summer Olympics.

References

1939 births
Living people
Croatian male rowers
Olympic rowers of Yugoslavia
Rowers at the 1960 Summer Olympics
People from Zaječar District